Harvard of the South (often stylized HARVARD of the SOUTH) is a four-piece rock band side project/supergroup that released its first recordings and played its first live concerts in 2014, but has its beginnings in collaborations between Longwave/Hurricane Bells vocalist/guitarist Steve Schiltz and the band Blue October, which date back to 2011. Harvard of the South released their debut EP, Miracle, in October 2014. Their song "Without" was released as a free download via SoundCloud on May 8, 2017. The band's long-awaited full album was released on December 11, 2020.

History
Blue October members Jeremy and Justin Furstenfeld became fans of the band Longwave upon seeing them perform in Austin, Texas during SXSW on the tour for their 2003 album, The Strangest Things. In interviews at the time, they touted Longwave as being their favorite band, and Jeremy still refers to Longwave as his favorite band ever, and in 2018, Justin referred to Longwave as one of his top three favorite bands.

Blue October's manager reached out to Longwave with the idea of the two bands touring together. The tour plans came to fruition in 2009, with Longwave opening Blue October's Approaching Normal summer tour, which also coincided with the release of Longwave's album Secrets Are Sinister. At the Boston date of this tour, Justin Furstenfeld joined Longwave on stage to sing the song "I Know It's Coming Someday". Following the tour, Longwave guitarist Shannon Ferguson became a father and announced he was taking a break from the band. The remaining members of Longwave decided to place the group on hiatus and work on other projects.

Longwave vocalist, Steve Schiltz, set to work on a solo project, which he dubbed Hurricane Bells. He was invited to open Blue October's spring 2010 Reason to Live tour, and together with other musicians on the tour, he formed a live backing band composed of Daniel Orvik of Stars of Track and Field, Ashen Keilyn of Scout, and Jeremy Furstenfeld and Ryan Delahoussaye of Blue October.

At the end of the 2010 tour, Blue October guitarist C.B. Hudson quit the band. On Blue October's next album, Any Man in America, Schiltz was asked to play guitar, which he did in exchange for Justin Furstenfeld providing harmonica on the new Hurricane Bells album, Down Comes the Rain, which included a cover of "Into the Ocean". Steve and Jeremy also began collaborating on songs that were outside of either Blue October or Hurricane Bells. Julian Mandrake was hired to replace Hudson as Blue October's guitarist, but he parted ways with the band over creative differences during pre-production sessions for their 2013 album, Sway.

Between 2012 and 2013, Steve and Jeremy composed eleven songs and recorded them at Jeremy's house, with the majority of their work occurring in 2012 while Justin was in rehab. Once the music was complete, Steve and Justin wrote lyrics to the music. Blue October's bassist, Matt Noveskey, was brought in to round out the group, and recording was completed in early 2014. Harvard of the South played their first concerts opening for Blue October in San Marcos, Texas in March 2014. Schiltz mixed the Harvard of the South album in the summer of 2014, and Fred Kevorkian mastered the tracks. In October, the first five songs were released as the limited-edition Miracle EP, which was sold at concerts.

The group played ten more concerts opening for Blue October in November 2014 and another seventeen in April and May 2015. In 2017, they released the song "WithOut" via free download. Although the band had recorded a full album, it remained unreleased as the members of Blue October were busy producing and promoting their album I Hope You're Happy. In 2018, Longwave reunited, toured with Blue October in October, and in 2019, released the album If We Ever Live Forever. Following the conclusion of the I Hope You're Happy tour, Blue October recorded the album This is What I Live For, on which Steve Schiltz contributed as a songwriter, guitarist, and guest vocalist. However, their 2020 tour plans were thwarted by the COVID-19 pandemic. Finding themselves with a lot of downtime, Jeremy Furstenfeld and Steve Schiltz revisited the Harvard of the South recordings. During the summer of 2020, they re-recorded parts of some songs and remixed and remastered the entire album, which was released on December 11, 2020 and debuted at number 6 on the iTunes rock chart.

Band members
 Steve Schiltz – vocals, guitar
 Justin Furstenfeld – vocals, guitar
 Jeremy Furstenfeld – drums
 Matt Noveskey – bass

Discography
 Miracle (2014 – EP)
 Harvard of the South (2020)

References

Indie rock musical groups from New York (state)
Musical groups from Brooklyn